Eurycormus is an extinct genus of prehistoric bony fish that lived from the Callovian stage of the Middle Jurassic epoch to the early Tithonian stage of the Late Jurassic epoch.

See also
 List of prehistoric bony fish genera

References

Prehistoric ray-finned fish genera
Middle Jurassic fish
Late Jurassic fish
Jurassic fish of Europe
Fossil taxa described in 1863
Taxa named by Johann Andreas Wagner